Mike Jesse (born 1 May 1973) is a former professional German footballer. 

Jesse began playing football for enterprise sports communities BSG Chemie Schmöckwitz, BSG Motor Wildau, BSG Lokomotive Schöneweide and BSG Rotation Berlin. He then joined the youth department of football club BFC Dynamo in 1989. 

Jesse made his first appearance with the first team of BFC Dynamo, then named FC Berlin, as a substitute for Jens-Uwe Zöphel away against F.C. Hansa Rostock in the 17th matchday of the 1990-91 NOFV-Oberliga on 17 March 1991. He then became a regular player for FC Berlin the 1991-92 NOFV-Oberliga.

Jesse left FC Berlin for BSV Brandeburg efter the 1993-94 season. He scored six goals in 33 games for BSV Brandenburg in the 1994-95 Regionalliga Nordost. He was then signed by FC Energie Cottbus for the following season. Jesse had sucess in the 1996-97 DFB-Pokal with FC Energie Cottbus. The team made it all the way to the final. However, Jesse did not appear in the final. He then achieved promotion to the 2. Bundesliga with FC Energie Cottbus in the 1996-97 Regionaliga Nordost. Jesse made 74 appearances for FC Energie Cottbus in the 2. Bundesliga.

References

External links 
 

1973 births
Living people
German footballers
Association football defenders
2. Bundesliga players
FC Energie Cottbus players
Tennis Borussia Berlin players
Berliner FC Dynamo players
DDR-Oberliga players
People from Königs Wusterhausen
Footballers from Brandenburg